Andrew Howe (born 12 May 1985) is an American-born Italian athlete who specializes in the long jump and sprinting. He won this event as well as the 200 metres at the 2004 World Junior Championships. He was successful at senior level at a young age, winning a long jump bronze at the 2006 IAAF World Indoor Championships before becoming the European Champion later that year. In 2007 he became the European Indoor Champion and won the silver medal at the 2007 World Championships in Athletics.

A combination of injuries ruled him out for most of the 2008 and 2009 seasons. He returned to action in 2010 and became the Italian champion, representing his country at the 2010 European Athletics Championships.

Biography

Howe was born in Los Angeles, United States, to Andrew Howe Sr and René Felton, an American hurdler who is a former United States Junior College National Record in the 100 meter hurdles in Europe and continued participating in Athletics at the Master Level winning Silver Medal 2001 European Indoor Championships 60 Meter hurdles. In 1992, Howe moved to Rieti, Italy with his mother after she divorced Howe Sr and remarried Italian Ugo Besozzi.

Coached by his mother, his international breakthrough came with the double gold medal in the men's long jump and 200 Meters at 2004 IAAF Junior World Championship in Grosseto, Italy 2006 World Indoor Championships, where he finished third. Later the same year he won the gold medal at the European Championships.

In the 2007 European Athletics Indoor Championships, he won gold with a fifth round leap of 8.30, after trailing his Greek competitor, and eventual silver medalist, Loúis Tsátoumas in the first four jumps.

In the 2007 World Championships, he won the silver medal with a sixth jump of 8.47, achieving the Italian national record and his personal best. He was only surpassed by Irving Saladino at his last jump with 8.57 m. He brought the year to a close with a win at the 2007 IAAF World Athletics Final, becoming the first Italian to win at the competition and only the second to win an event at an IAAF season-end contest. He was given the first European Athletics Rising Star Award in recognition of his achievements that season.

Following this, his 2008 season was blighted by a shoulder injury and then hamstring problems, and he did not make it past the qualifiers of the long jump at the 2008 Summer Olympics. The next season held further physical problems for the Italian and surgery on his Achilles tendon ruled him out for the year.

He returned to action in July 2010 with a win in the long jump at the Italian Athletics Championships. He attempted to defend his continental title at the 2010 European Athletics Championships, but his jump of 8.12 m brought him fifth place and Christian Reif succeeded him to the European title. Nearing the end of the season, Howe ran in the 200 m at the Notturna di Milano – marking a return to an event in which he had competed sparely. In a return to form, he won the race and although he eased up in the final metres he recorded a time of 20.30 seconds – two hundredths away from his long-standing personal best.

He completed his winter training in Qatar and at the University of California, Los Angeles. At the start of the outdoor season he ran a personal best and European-leading time of 45.70 seconds over 400 metres and then took a surprise win over 200 m at the Golden Gala in Rome with a run of 20.31 seconds (also a season's best for Europe).

Italian Olympic gold medal sprinter Lamont Marcell Jacobs said that when he was growing up, Howe, who is also mixed-race and half-American, was his idol.

National records
 Long jump: 8.47 m (Osaka, 30 August 2007) - Current holder
 Long jump indoor: 8.30 m (Birmingham, 4 March 2007) - Current holder
 Mixed 4 × 400 metres relay: 3:16.15 (Yokohama, 11 May 2019) with Re, Trevisan, Lukudo - Current holder

Achievements
Youth

Senior

National titles
Howe won seven national championships at individual senior level.

Italian Athletics Championships
200 m: 2007, 2011, 2012 (3)
Long jump: 2007, 2010 (2)
Italian Indoor Athletics Championships
Long jump: 2006, 2007 (2)

See also
 FIDAL Hall of Fame
 Men's long jump Italian record progression
 Italian all-time lists - Long jump
 Italian all-time lists - 200 metres
 Italy national relay team

References

External links
 
 Official website 

1985 births
Living people
People from Rieti
Italian male sprinters
Italian male long jumpers
Olympic athletes of Italy
Athletes (track and field) at the 2004 Summer Olympics
Athletes (track and field) at the 2008 Summer Olympics
World Athletics Championships athletes for Italy
World Athletics Championships medalists
European Athletics Championships medalists
American emigrants to Italy
Naturalised citizens of Italy
Athletics competitors of Centro Sportivo Aeronautica Militare
European Athletics Rising Star of the Year winners
Italian Athletics Championships winners
Track and field athletes from Los Angeles
Sportspeople from the Province of Rieti
Italian people of African-American descent